= Vanvadi (Sadashivgad) =

Banvadi
- village
- Banvadi
- Location in Maharashtra, India
- Coordinates: 17.4061°N 74.2482°E
- Country: India
- State: Maharashtra
- District: Satara
- Established: 1959

Government
  - Type: Grampanchayat
  - Body: Banvadi grampanchayat

Population (2001)
  - Total: 3,944

Languages
  - Official: Marathi
- Time zone: UTC+5:30 (IST)

Banvadi (Sadashivgad) is a census town in Satara district in the Indian state of Maharashtra.

== Demographics ==
As of 2001 India census, Vanvadi (Sadashivgad) had a population of 3944. Males constitute 52% of the population and females 48%. Vanvadi (Sadashivgad) has an average literacy rate of 79%, higher than the national average of 59.5%: male literacy is 83%, and female literacy is 75%. In Vanvadi (Sadashivgad), 11% of the population is under 6 years of age.
